Macbett (1972) is Eugène Ionesco's satire on Shakespeare's Macbeth.

Plot
Two generals, Macbett and Banco, put down a rebellion. In payment for their heroic service, Archduke Duncan promises to bestow on them land, titles and cash, but he reneges on the deal. Encouraged by the seductive Lady Duncan, Macbett plots to assassinate the Archduke and crown himself King. He tries to maintain his tenuous grip on the throne through a vicious cycle of murder and bloodshed. Meanwhile, he is haunted by the ghosts of his victims and discovers that his new wife is not all that she seems.

Themes
Written during the Cold War, Ionesco's Macbett remoulds Shakespeare's Macbeth into a comic tale of ambition, corruption, cowardice and excess, creating a tragic farce which takes human folly to its wildest extremes. Innovations include a long conversation between the thanes of Glamiss and Candor, the characters of a lemonade seller and butterfly hunter, and the revelation that the rightful heir to the throne is a worse tyrant than Macbett ever was.

See also
 List of Romanian plays

References

Sources

Plays by Eugène Ionesco
Romanian plays
Theatre of the Absurd
1972 plays
Plays and musicals based on Macbeth
Plays set in Scotland
Satirical plays